Anka Tore, also Enge Tore, was an Emir of a large Ulus in Moghulistan. He is mentioned in the works of Zafarnama Yazdi, Zafarnama Shami and Mojmal al-Tawarikh. He fought against Timur for dominance in the region.

Origin
According to Zafarnama, Anka Tore was the nephew of Hadji Bek Arkinut, one of the commanders of Tughlugh Timur, the founder of the state of Moghulistan. The yurt of Hadji bek and Anka Tore was located in the valley of the Karatal river in Jeti Suu. The Turkic term "Töre" means that the owner belongs to the highest nobility.

Life
The influence of Anka Tore increased during the period of civil strife in Moghulistan in 1370–1380. In 1387-1388 he made a campaign in Transoxiana, captured the environs of Samarkand and Bukhara and captured «booty without number and count». In the late 1380s, in connection with the intensification of Timur's aggressive policy in the Jeti Suu and Desht-i Kipchak, Anka Tore, Khan of the Golden Horde Tokhtamysh and Qamar-ud-din, Emir of the Ulus in Moghulistan, concluded a military alliance against Timur. In 1389 Khizr Khoja, the new khan of Moghulistan, joined this alliance. 
 
The established alliance contributed to the unification of the disparate political and military forces of the Golden Horde and Moghulistan against a single enemy. The coalition was directed against Timur's attempts to make the population of the territories of modern Kazakhstan and Kyrgyzstan dependent, to prevent the strengthening of the economic and political independence of the states on the territory of Desht-i-Kipchak, Jeti Suu and Tian Shan. In response to the unification of the forces of the rulers of the Golden Horde and Moghulistan, Timur undertook two of the most severe predatory campaigns in terms of consequences for the indigenous population: in 1389 to Moghulistan and in 1390–1391 to the Golden Horde. 
 
In 1387, Anka Tore, with 20,000 troops, began a campaign in Ferghana and captured the cities of Tashkent, Sayram, Andijan and Özgön.

 
Akhsikendi tells about the joint campaign of Toktamysh and Anka Tore and their struggle for the Tian Shan and the Fergana valley. The main fighting took place in the valley of the river. Talas. The source also says that Toktamysh, having united the military detachments of the Baarin possessions, advanced through the upper reaches of Talas to the place of the battle. 
 
In 1390, Timur's army proceeded to Issyk-Kul, then on Kok Tobe, passed Almaliq, crossed the Ili riverand overtook Anka Tore on the Karatal river. First, Timur defeated 10,000-strong army of Anka Tore, then through Tarbagatai went to the Ayagöz river to destroy the main forces of Anka Tore. The army, led by Timur's son Umar Shaikh Mirza, overtook the army of Anka Tore at Saur mountain, on which Anka Tore was defeated and went beyond the Irtysh to the Four Oirat. 
 
There is no information about the further fate of Anka Tore.

Legacy
Anka Tore is the ancestor of the modern Kyrgyz tribe . The genealogy of Anka Tore described in Mojmal al-Tawarikh coincides with the genealogy of the Kyrgyz tribe Monoldor.

References

Year of birth unknown
Year of death unknown
History of Kyrgyzstan
Military leaders
Military strategists
Chagatai Khanate
Moghulistan